Herschel, Herschell, Herschelle or Hershel is a given name and a surname of German and Jewish origins. Notable people with the name include:

Given name
 Herschel W. Arant (1887–1941), American legal academic
 Herschel Austin (1911–1974), British furniture-maker and politician
 Benjamin Herschel Babbage (1815–1878) South Australian explorer
 Herschel Baltimore (1921–1968), American basketball player
 Herschel "Guy" Beahm IV (born 1982), American Twitch streamer and internet celebrity known as Dr DisRespect
 Walter Herschel Beech (1891–1950), American aviator
 Herschel Bennett (1896–1964), American baseball player
 Herschel Bernardi (1923–1986), American actor
 Richard Hershel Bloom (born 1953), U.S. politician from California
 Herschel F. Briles (1914–1994), U.S. Army soldier and Medal of Honor recipient
 Herschel Bullen (1870–1966), American businessman
 Herschel Burgess, American college football player
 Herschel Caldwell (1903–1989), American college football player
 Herschel L. Carnahan (1879–1941), U.S. politician from California
 Herschel W. Cleveland (born 1946), U.S. politician from Arkansas
 Herschel H. Cudd (1912–1992), American chemist
 Herschel Daugherty (1910–1993), American film and television director
 Hershel Dennis (born 1984), American football player
 Robert Herschel Donaldson (born 1943) American political scientist
 Herschel Evans (1909–1939), American saxophonist
 Herschel Forester (born 1931), American football player
 Herschel Friday (1922–1994), American lawyer
 Herschel Garfein, American composer
 Herschel Burke Gilbert (1918–2003), American composer
 Herschelle Gibbs (born 1974), South African cricketer
 John Herschel Glenn (1921–2016), American astronaut
 Herschel Gluck, British rabbi
 Hershel W. Gober (born 1936), former U.S. Secretary of Veterans Affairs
 Harry Golden (1902–1981), born Herschel Goldhirsch, American newspaper publisher
 David Herschel Goodman, American television writer and producer
 Herschel Green (1920–2006), American flying ace
 Hershel Greene, fictional character from The Walking Dead series
 Herschel Lynn Greer (1906–1976), American businessman
 Michael Herschel Greger (born 1972), American physician
 Herschel Grynszpan (1921 – after 1942), assassin of German diplomat Ernst vom Rath
 Herschel Hardin (born 1936), Canadian political activist
 Herschel H. Hatch (1837–1920), U.S. politician from Michigan
 Herschel M. Hogg (1853–1934), U.S. politician from Colorado
 Herschel Lee Howell (1912–1990), Canadian politician from Saskatchewan
 Herschel Johnson (1894–1966), U.S. diplomat from North Carolina
 Herschel V. Jones (1861–1928), American newspaper publisher
 Herschel Krustofski, fictional character from The Simpsons, better known as "Krusty The Clown"
 Herschel Lashkowitz (1918–1993), U.S. politician from North Dakota
 William Hershel Lattimore (1884–1919), American baseball player
 Hershel Layton, protagonist of the Professor Layton fictional universe
 Herschel Leibowitz (1925–2011), American psychologist
 Herschell Gordon Lewis (1929–2016), a U.S. filmmaker, dubbed the Godfather of Gore
 Herschel C. Loveless (1911–1989), 34th governor of Iowa
 Patrick Jermaine Herschel van Luijk (born 1984), Dutch sprinter
 Hershel Ray Martin (1909–1980), American baseball player
 Heinrich Marx (1777–1838), born Herschel Mordechai, Prussian lawyer and father of Karl Marx
 Godlen Herschelle Derrick Masimla (born 1992), South African rugby player
 Hershel Matt (1922–1987), American rabbi
 Herschel Mayall (1863–1941), American actor
 Herschel McCoy (1912–1956), American costume designer
 Hershel McGriff (born 1927), American stock car racer
 Clifford Herschel Moore (1866–1931), American Latin scholar
 Hershel of Ostropol, a prominent figure in Jewish humor
 Hershel Parker, American literary historian
 Herschel Clifford Parker (1867–1931), American physicist
 Hershel Reichman (born 1944), American rabbi
 Herschel L. Roman (1914–1989), American geneticist
 Herschel Rosenthal (1918–2009), U.S. politician from California
 Hershel Schachter (born 1941), American rabbi
 Herschel Schacter (1917–2013), American rabbi
 C. Herschel Schooley (1900–1985), American newspaper editor
 Hershel Shanks (born 1930), American archeologist
 William Hershel Sharpe (born 1951), American television anchor
 Herschel Sims (born 1991), American football player
 Herschel Smith (1900–1964), American wrestler
 Herschel Curry Smith (1903–1983), American track coach and athlete
 Herschel Sparber (born 1943), American actor
 Herschel Stockton (1913–1965), American football player
 Arn Herschel Tellem (born 1954), American businessman
 Herschell Turner (born 1938), American basketball player
 Herschel Vespasian Johnson (1812–1880), U.S. politician from Georgia
 Herschel Walker (born 1962), American football player and politician
 Eli Herschel Wallach (1915–2014), American actor
 Herschel Weingrod (born 1947), American screenwriter
 Hershel W. Williams (1923–2022), U.S. marine and Medal of Honor recipient
 Roger Herschel Zion (1921–2019), U.S. politician from Indiana

Surname
The name is closely tied to the Herschel family, an Anglo-German family of astronomers:
 William Herschel (1738–1822), astronomer and composer, discoverer of Uranus
 Caroline Herschel (1750–1848), astronomer and singer, sister of Sir William Herschel
 John Herschel (1792–1871), mathematician and astronomer, son of Sir William Herschel
 Alexander Stewart Herschel (1836–1907), astronomer, grandson of Sir William Herschel
 William James Herschel (1833–1917), Indian Civil Service officer, grandson of Sir William Herschel
 John Herschel the Younger (1837–1921), military engineer, surveyor and astronomer, grandson of Sir William Herschel

Other notable people with the surname include:
 Clemens Herschel (1842–1930), American hydraulic engineer
 May Herschel-Clarke (1850–1950), English poet
 Allan Herschell (1851–1927), creator of amusement park rides
 Farrer Herschell, 1st Baron Herschell (1837–1899), former Lord Chancellor of Great Britain
 Richard Herschell, 2nd Baron Herschell (1878–1929), British politician
 Ridley Haim Herschell (1807–1864), Anglo-Polish minister
 Rognvald Herschell, 3rd Baron Herschell (1923–2008), British politician
 Solomon Hirschell (1762–1842), British rabbi

English-language masculine given names
English masculine given names
German masculine given names